Active shooter or active killer describes the perpetrator of a type of mass murder marked by rapidity, scale, randomness, and often suicide. The Federal Bureau of Investigation defines an active shooter as "one or more individuals actively engaged in killing or attempting to kill people in a populated area.", excluding self-defense, gang or drug violence, crossfire, and domestic disputes. The United States Department of Homeland Security defines an active shooter as "an individual actively engaged in killing or attempting to kill people in a confined and populated area; in most cases, active shooters use firearms and there is no pattern or method to this selection of victims."

Most incidents occur at locations in which the killers find little impediment in pressing their attack. Locations are generally described as soft targets, that is, they carry limited security measures to protect members of the public. In most instances, shooters die by suicide, are shot by police, or surrender when confrontation with responding law enforcement becomes unavoidable, and active shooter events are often over in 10 to 15 minutes. "According to New York City Police Department (NYPD) statistics, 46percent of active shooter incidents are ended by the application of force by police or security, 40percent end in the shooter's suicide, 14percent of the time the shooter surrenders, and in less than 1percent of cases the violence ends with the attacker fleeing."

Terminology 

In police training manuals, the police response to an active shooter scenario is different from hostage rescue and barricaded suspect situations. Police officers responding to an armed barricaded suspect often deploy with the intention of containing the suspect within a perimeter, gaining information about the situation, attempting negotiation with the suspect, and waiting for specialist teams like SWAT.

If police officers believe that a shooter intends to kill as many people as possible before killing themselves, they may use a tactic like immediate action rapid deployment.

The terminology "active shooter" is critiqued by some academics. There have been several mass stabbings that have high casualty counts, for instance in Belgium (Dendermonde nursery attack; 1 adult and 2 infants dead), Canada (2014 Calgary stabbing; 5 adults dead), China (2008 Beijing Drum Tower stabbings; 1 adult dead), Japan (Osaka School Massacre and Sagamihara stabbings; 8 children and 19 sleeping disabled adults dead, respectively), and Pennsylvania (Franklin Regional High School stabbing; no deaths). Ron Borsch recommends the term rapid mass murder. Due to a worldwide increase in firearm and non-firearm based mass casualty attacks, including attacks with vehicles, explosives, incendiary devices, stabbings, slashing, and acid attacks, Tau Braun and the Violence Prevention Agency (VPA) has encouraged the use of the more accurate descriptor mass casualty attacker (MCA).

Tactical implications 

According to Ron Borsch, active shooters are not inclined to negotiate, preferring to kill as many people as possible, often to gain notoriety. Active shooters generally do not lie in wait to battle responding law enforcement officers. Few law enforcement officers have been injured responding to active shooter incidents; fewer still have been killed. As noted, more often than not, when the prospect of confrontation with responding law enforcement becomes unavoidable, the active shooter commits suicide. And when civilians—even unarmed civilians—resist, the active shooter crumbles.

Borsch's statistical analysis recommends a tactic: aggressive action. For law enforcement, the tactical imperative is to respond and engage the killer without delaythe affected orthodoxy of cumbersome team formations fails to answer the rapid temporal dynamics of active shooter events and fails to grasp the nature of the threat involved. For civilians, when necessity or obligation calls, the tactical mandate is to attack the attacker—a strategy that has proved successful across a range of incidents from Norina Bentzel (William Michael Stankewicz) in Pennsylvania and Bill Badger in Arizona (2011 Tucson shooting) to David Benke in Colorado.

Causation 

Accounts of what factors lead to this type of incident vary. Some contend that the motive, at least proximately, is vengeance. Others argue that bullying breeds the problem, and sometimes the active shooter is a victim of bullying, directly or indirectly. Still others such as Grossman and DeGaetano argue that the pervasiveness of violent imagery girding modern culture hosts the phenomenon. Another suggestion is that a particular interpretation of the world, a conscious or subconscious ontology, accounts for the phenomenon. Proponents of this idea argue that the active shooter lives in a world of victims and victimizers, that all are one or the other. The ontology accommodates no room between the categories for benevolence, friendship or a mixture of good and bad. Their interpretation of the world may be fed by bullying or violent imagery (hence the common obsession with violent movies, books or video games), but it is the absolutist interpretation that drives them both to kill and to die.

In The Psychology of the Active Killer, Daniel Modell writes that "The world conceived by the active killer is a dark dialectic of victim and victimizer. His impoverished ontology brooks no nuance, admits no resolution. The two categories, isolated and absolute, exhaust and explain his world. And the peculiar logic driving the dialectic yields a fatal inference: in a world of victims and victimizers, success means victimization."

See also 

 Ballistic shield
 Immediate action rapid deployment
 List of massacres
 Running amok
 School shooting
 Spree killer
 Active shooter training

References

External links 

 Active Shooter Mitigation Quiz
 Active Continuous Training (ACT)
 FBI releases study on active shooter incidents
 Surviving an active shooter situation—what to do when someone is shooting at you
 Four Ways PSIM Can Help in Active Shooter Situations

Law enforcement terminology
Mass murder
Rampages